The   is a river in Poland and the Czech Republic, a right (eastern) tributary of the River Oder. It flows from the Silesian Beskids mountains through southern Cieszyn Silesia in Poland and the Frýdek-Místek and Karviná districts of the Czech Republic, often forming the border with Poland. It flows into the Oder River north of Bohumín. The Olza-Oder confluence also forms a part of the border.

The river is a symbol of the Zaolzie region, which lies on its west bank, constituting a part of the western half of Cieszyn Silesia, as depicted in the words of the unofficial anthem of this region and of local Poles, Płyniesz Olzo po dolinie (Thou flowest, Olza, down the valley), written by Jan Kubisz.

The Olza has also inspired many other artists. Among those who have written about the river are Adolf Fierla, Pola Gojawiczyńska, Emanuel Grim, Julian Przyboś, Vladislav Vančura, and Adam Wawrosz. The singer Jaromír Nohavica has used the Olza as a motif in several of his songs.

Name 
The oldest surviving written mention is in a letter dating from 1290, which refers to the river Olza. The river was then mentioned in a written document in 1611 as the Oldza. At the end of the 19th century, with the rise of mass nationalism, both Polish and Czech activists claimed the name Olza to be not Polish enough, on the one hand, and insufficiently Czech, on the other. Some Polish activists proposed the name Olsza, Czech activists Olše.

The Czech linguist and writer Vincenc Prasek demonstrated in 1900 that the name Olza has, in fact, an independent Old Slavic origin which predates both Polish and Czech. This revelation has been confirmed by various etymological studies in the 20th century. The regionally used form Olza is derived from the ancient Oldza. German Olsa is a re-spelling of Olza but pronounced the same. Local people always used the Olza form, regardless of their national or ethnic origin.

However, the central administration in Prague saw Olza as a Polish name and when most of the river became a part of Czechoslovakia in 1920 it tried to change its name to the Czech form, Olše. However, a degree of dualism in the naming persisted until the 1960s, when the Central State Administration of Geodesy and Cartography ruled that the only official form in the Czech Republic is Olše. Locals on both sides of the border and from both nationalities continue to refer to the river as the Olza nevertheless.

Towns and villages on the river 
(from source to the mouth)

 Istebna (PL)
 Bukovec
 Písek
 Jablunkov
 Návsí
 Hrádek
 Bystřice
 Vendryně
 Lyžbice
 Třinec
 Konská
 Ropice
 Český Těšín / Cieszyn (PL)
 Chotěbuz
 Pogwizdów (PL)
 Louky nad Olší
 Kaczyce (PL)
 Darkov
 Fryštát
 Karviná
 Dětmarovice
 Závada
 Godów (PL)
 Věřňovice
 Kopytov
 Olza (PL)

Gallery

Footnotes

References 

 

 

 

 

 

Rivers of Silesian Voivodeship
Rivers of the Moravian-Silesian Region
Frýdek-Místek District
Karviná District
Silesian Beskids
Cieszyn Silesia
International rivers of Europe
Czech Republic–Poland border
Border rivers